This is a list of actors and actresses who have had roles on the soap opera As the World Turns.

Cast members

References

External links

As the World Turns
As the World Turns